Anderson Bridge massacre refers to the massacre of Hindu passengers on the Anderson Bridge on 12 February 1950.

Background 
Anderson Bridge also known as the Bhairab Bridge is a 1 km long railway bridge over the Meghna River, connecting Bhairab Bazar Junction in Kishoreganj District with Ashuganj in Brahmanbaria District.  The bridge carries a single metre-gauge rail track.  In 1950, it was an important rail link connecting Dhaka and Mymensingh districts on the west with Sylhet, Comilla and Chittagong districts in the east.

Events 
On 12 February, most of the Hindu passengers travelling on this train route were murdered.  All the cases followed a pattern.  The assailants would board the trains from either side either at Bhairab Bazar Junction or Ashuganj, just before the train departed.  They would lock the doors of the compartment from inside. When the train was completely on the bridge, the train would stop. The assailants would pick out the Hindus one by one, force them out of the compartment, slit their throats and throw their corpses into the river.

According to Tathagata Roy, it was a carefully planned massacre. The train crew and the guard were involved in it.  Prabhas Chandra Lahiri has held Aziz Ahmed, the Chief Secretary of East Bengal and Abdul Majid, the District Magistrate of Rajshahi responsible for this massacre.

See also 
 1950 Barisal Riots

References 

Massacres in Pakistan
1950 in East Pakistan
Mass murder in 1950
Massacres of Bengali Hindus in East Pakistan
Government of Liaquat Ali Khan
February 1950 events in Asia
1950 murders in Pakistan
Massacres in 1950